The East African Legislative Assembly (EALA) is a sub-organ of the larger East African Community, being the legislative arm of the Community. Members are sworn into five-year terms.

History
Since colonial times, a number of organizations have sought to integrate the region of East Africa. During the Victorian Era, rail links were established, and a number of regional organizations, such as the East African Currency Board and the East African Court of Appeal were established. A new wave of agreements and organizations were launched during the mid-20th century.

The Treaty for East African Co-operation was signed in 1967, launching the East African Community. However, due to political differences and weak participation, the treaty was nullified in 1977, ending the East African Community.

Despite this, interest in further regional cooperation continued. On 14 May 1984, the East African Community Mediation Agreement was signed, which pledged to "explore and identify areas for future co-operation and to make arrangements for such co-operation". On 26 November 1994, representatives from Uganda, Kenya, and Tanzania signed the Agreement for the Establishment of a Permanent Tripartite Commission, which established a commission to further cooperation among the three countries. On 29 April 1999, the Tripartite Commission completed its analysis on the prospects of regional cooperation, and the three countries signed an agreement to upgrade the Agreement to a treaty for 2000.

First Assembly (2001-2006) 
The East African Legislative Assembly was inaugurated on 30 November 2001 as the legislative arm of the newly revived East African Community. The Assembly met in Arusha, Tanzania, where the Tripartite Commission announced it would upgrade to a treaty. Abdulrahman Kinana, an Elected Member from Tanzania was unanimous elected the Speaker of the First Assembly. The First Assembly met until 2006.

Second Assembly (2007-2012) 
On 1 July 2007, Burundi and Rwanda joined the East African Community, and, therefore, the East Africa Legislative Assembly. Abdirahim Abdi of Kenya served the Speaker of the Second Assembly.

The elected members of the second EALA (2007–12) break down by political party as follows:

Third Assembly (2012-2017) 

Margaret Zziwa of Uganda served as the speaker from 2012 to 2014. She was succeeded by Daniel Kidega, who served from 2014 until the end of the Third Assembly in 2017.

Fourth Assembly (2017-2022) 
The Fourth Assembly has a total of 62 members, of which each member state submits 9 elected members, and 8 ex-officio members. Its speaker is Martin Ngoga of Rwanda.

The following table lists the elected members of the Fourth Assembly of the East African Legislative Assembly:

The following table lists the ex-officio members of the Fourth Assembly of the East African Legislative Assembly:

Composition

As of the Fourth Assembly, the East African Legislative Assembly has 62 members, of which each member state submits 9 elected members, and 8 ex-officio members.

According to Article 50 of the East African Community Treaty, members are elected by their respective country's national legislature. Article 50 also calls upon said members to reflect their country's political parties, opinions, gender composition, and other special groups.

The ex-officio members of the Assembly are to be each member state's minister for regional cooperation, the Secretary General of the East African Community, and the Counsel to the Community.

Functions
Article 49 of the East African Community Treaty stipulates that the responsibilities of the East African Legislative Assembly are to "be the legislative organ of the Community", "liaise with the National Assemblies of the Partner States on matters relating to the Community", "debate and approve the budget of the Community", "consider annual reports on the activities of the Community, annual audit reports of the Audit Commission and any other reports referred to it by the Council", "discuss all matters pertaining to the Community and make recommendations to the Council as it may deem necessary for the implementation of the Treaty", "establish any committee or committees for such purposes as it deems necessary", "recommend to the Council the appointment of the Clerk and other officers of the Assembly", and "make its rules of procedure and those of its committees".

Committees
As Article 49 of the East African Community Treaty outlines, the East African Legislative Assembly has the right to "establish any committee or committees for such purposes as it deems necessary". As of 2020, the Assembly has the following seven committees:

 The Commission Committee
 The Accounts Committee
 The Committee on Legal, Rules, and Privileges
 The Committee on Agriculture, Tourism and Natural Resources
 The Committee on Regional Affairs and Conflict Resolution
 The Committee on Communication, Trade and Investment
 The Committee on General Purpose

Activities since inauguration

Since its inauguration, EALA has held several sittings as a Plenary in Arusha, Kampala and Nairobi. During these sittings, EALA has:
 adopted its rules of procedure;
 elected the Speaker of the Assembly;
 recommended to the Council of Ministers the appointment of the Officers of the Assembly;
 approved the budgets for the EAC for the 2002-3 and 2003-4 fiscal years;
 asked the Council of Ministers 19 questions, which were duly answered;
 adopted five resolutions;
 held seminars on a wide range of issues in relation to their mandate; and
 passed six bills into law.

The Committees have continuously got briefs from the Secretariat and given advice with regard to progress in the implementation of the Treaty.

Impact 

One 2015 paper suggested that the structure of the East African Community Treaty created the East African Community in a way that the East African Legislative Assembly often butted heads with the East African Community Council of Ministers, which harmed the efficacy of the Assembly.

References

 
East African Community
African Union
Arusha
Organisations based in Kampala
Nairobi
Supranational legislatures
2001 establishments in Africa